John Henry Welborn House was a historic home located at Lexington, Davidson County, North Carolina. It was built about 1870, and was a two-story, Italianate style frame I-house dwelling.  It had a two-story rear wing and "L"-configuration.  It was remodeled in the Neo-Classical style around the turn of the 20th century.  Also on the property was a contributing smokehouse.  The house has been demolished.

It was added to the National Register of Historic Places in 1984.

References

Houses on the National Register of Historic Places in North Carolina
Italianate architecture in North Carolina
Houses completed in 1870
Houses in Davidson County, North Carolina
National Register of Historic Places in Davidson County, North Carolina